Salinimicrobium soli is a Gram-negative, facultatively anaerobic and rod-shaped bacterium from the genus of Salinimicrobium which has been isolated from soil from reclaimed land.

References

Flavobacteria
Bacteria described in 2016